The 1921 South Dakota State Jackrabbits football team was an American football team that represented South Dakota State University as an independent during the 1921 college football season. In its third season under head coach Charles A. West, the team compiled a 7–1 record and outscored opponents by a total of 255 to 38.

Schedule

References

South Dakota State
South Dakota State Jackrabbits football seasons
South Dakota State Jackrabbits football